Heinz Hermann (born 28 March 1958) is a Swiss former professional footballer who played as a midfielder. With 118 international matches (15 goals) between 1978 and 1991 for the Switzerland national team he is record national player ahead of Alain Geiger and Stéphane Chapuisat.

Club
Herrmann was born in Zürich. On 1 July 1977, he moved from FC Seefeld Zürich to Grasshopper Club Zürich, where he became Swiss league champion four times and cup champion once. At the end of the season 1984–85 he changed to Neuchâtel Xamax, and he later played for Servette FC and FC Aarau. Between 1984 and 1988 he was awarded Player of the year five years in a row.

Hermann's first international match came in September 1978 with the 2–0 victory against the USA. In November 1991 he ended his international match career after a 1–0 loss to Romania.

His clubs as a coach include SR Delémont (manager), FC Vaduz in Liechtenstein, SV Waldhof Mannheim (assistant coach) and FC Basel, where he had filled a number of roles. In July 2012 he became new sports director of FC Luzern, but he was sacked on 6 February 2013.

Honours
Grasshoppers
 Nationalliga A: 1977–78, 1981–82, 1982–83, 1983–84
 Swiss Cup: 1982–83

Neuchâtel Xamax
 Nationalliga A: 1986–87, 1987–88
Swiss Super Cup: 1987

Individual
 Swiss Footballer of the Year: 1983–84, 1984–85, 1985–86, 1986–87, 1987–88

See also
List of men's footballers with 100 or more international caps

References

External links
 

1958 births
Living people
Footballers from Zürich
Swiss men's footballers
Association football midfielders
Switzerland international footballers
Servette FC players
Grasshopper Club Zürich players
Neuchâtel Xamax FCS players
FC Aarau players
FIFA Century Club
Swiss football managers
Servette FC managers
FC Basel managers
FC Vaduz managers
Swiss-German people
Swiss expatriate football managers
Swiss expatriate sportspeople in Liechtenstein
Expatriate football managers in Liechtenstein